Gertrud de Lalsky (27 January 1878 in Danzig – 16 September 1958 in Berlin) was a German actress.

Selected filmography
 Catherine the Great (1920)
 Hypnosis (1920)
 Fridericus Rex (1922)
 The Island of Tears (1923)
 Prater (1924)
 Gobseck (1924)
 Debit and Credit (1924)
 The Humble Man and the Chanteuse (1925)
 I Lost My Heart in Heidelberg (1926)
 Chance the Idol (1927)
 Out of the Mist (1927)
 Linden Lady on the Rhine (1927)
 My Heidelberg, I Can Not Forget You (1927)
 The Strange Night of Helga Wangen (1928)
 A Girl with Temperament (1928)
 Crucified Girl (1929)
 Painted Youth (1929)
 The Love Waltz (1930)
 The Emperor's Sweetheart (1931)
 Mädchen in Uniform (1931)
 Holzapfel Knows Everything (1932)
 The English Marriage (1934)
 The Higher Command (1935)
 Dinner Is Served (1936)
 The Great and the Little Love (1938)
 Heimat (1938)
 The Blue Fox (1938)
 Target in the Clouds (1939)
 Madame Butterfly (1939)
 Carl Peters (1941)
 Die beiden Schwestern (1943)
 Anna Alt (1945)
 The Noltenius Brothers (1945)
 The Court Concert (1948)

References

External links

1878 births
1958 deaths
German stage actresses
German film actresses
German silent film actresses
Actresses from Gdańsk
People from West Prussia
20th-century German actresses